James Dawkins (c. 1696–1766) was an English landowner and politician.

Life
He was the second son of Colonel Richard Dawkins of Clarendon, a plantation and slave owner in Jamaica, member of the Assembly (died c. 1698/1701/1705, of a Leicestershire family), and his second wife Mrs. Elizabeth Masters (d. 1702). He matriculated at Magdalen College, Oxford on 28 March 1713, at age 16.

Dawkins, of Rusley Park, Bishopstone, Wiltshire, bought land at Over Norton in Oxfordshire, the Busby estate. In 1747 he lost his seat, to John Bateman, 2nd Viscount Bateman, who was backed by Charles Spencer, 3rd Duke of Marlborough.

In the 1750s, Dawkins was considered a Jacobite. He died unmarried on 10 May 1766. His Over Norton Park estate went to Henry Dawkins, his nephew.

Notes

1766 deaths
18th-century English landowners
Members of the Parliament of Great Britain for English constituencies
British MPs 1734–1741
British MPs 1741–1747
Year of birth uncertain